Green River Reservoir State Park may refer to:
an alternate name for Green River Lake State Park in Kentucky
Green River Reservoir State Park (Vermont)